St. Elmo is a historic residence on the National Register of Historic Places, located in MidTown Columbus, Georgia at 2808 18th Avenue.

Overview
Colonel Seaborn Jones drew all the plans for his home and called it El Dorado, land of beauty. The house was begun in 1828 and completed in 1833. The materials used to build this house, with the exception of the marble and the mahogany, were taken from the property itself. A small lake now fills the place where the clay was removed. To this El Dorado, Colonel Seaborn Jones brought his wife and children, a daughter and a son, in 1833. In 1833, Henry L. Benning, an aspiring young lawyer, wrote a friend: "Above all things (I advise if you desire ease and happiness) marry. Marry a lady of accomplishment, i.e. worth $100,000. It will be better than quibbling. I am anxious to experiment at least." In 1839, Benning, for whom Fort Benning is named, married Colonel Seaborn Jones's daughter.

Many historic personages were entertained at El Dorado among them were President Millard Fillmore, President James K. Polk, Henry Clay, General Winfield Scott, and Edwin Booth. Also, here Mrs. Jones's niece, Augusta Jane Evans Wilson, finished her celebrated novel, St. Elmo. In 1878, the home was purchased by Captain and Mrs. James J. Slade who changed its name to St. Elmo in honor of the novel which it had inspired.

Fire
At approximately 2:00 p.m. on October 5, 2011, a fire broke out in the basement wine cellar of St. Elmo. Apparently started by a single candle, the fire did extensive damage to the structure, but was repaired.

See also
Columbus, Georgia
MidTown (Columbus, Georgia)

References

External links

Houses on the National Register of Historic Places in Georgia (U.S. state)
Greek Revival houses in Georgia (U.S. state)
Houses in Columbus, Georgia
National Register of Historic Places in Muscogee County, Georgia